Mel Karade Rabba is a 2010 Punjabi film directed by Navaniat Singh and written by Dheeraj Rattan; produced by Rajan Batra and Vivek Ohri; it stars Jimmy Sheirgill and Neeru Bajwa in the lead roles. Pop singer Gippy Grewal made his acting debut as the antagonist with the film. Amar Noorie, Sunita Dhir and Shavinder Mahal also make appearances.

The film released on 16 July 2010.

Plot
Rajveer (Jimmy Sheirgill) and Nihal (Gippy Grewal) are college enemies. One day Rajveer was beating up one of Nihal's friend. There he sees Seerat (Neeru Bajwa). Rajveer's father is a martyr soldier. His mother is proud of the awards and trophies that her son gets. He has told his family that he is a topper. But he the topper is Rajveer Dhillon. Rajveer Gill replaces Dhillon with Gill.  But she doesn't know that they are all fake. One day Rajveer gets the alliance of Seerat. At first he doesn't agree, but after seeing her picture, he agrees. When his family and Rajveer go see Seerat , Seerat remembers that Rajveer is a thug and she disagrees. But, Rajveer lies that he was trying to break up the fight. After hearing this, both families accept the alliance. Rajvir starts to follow Seerat everywhere and this makes Seerat annoyed. She makes a plan and calls Rajveer to a date for coffee. There she tells him that she's had an affair with many boys. After hearing this, Rajveer is shocked, but his friend tells him that she went to an all girl school. Rajveer calls Seerat on a date and tells her that he has also dated many girls, which irks Seerat. Then she hatches another plan. Her grandmother calls Seerat's father and tell him that she wants to meet the boy. Seerat and Rajveer go to her grandmother's house. During the two days, Rajveer wins the hearts of Seerat and her grandmother. But Seerat's dad finds out that Rajveer is not a topper, but a flunker. Learning the truth about Rajvir, Seerat's father tells Rajveer that he should break his daughter' heart. A heartbroken Rajveer breaks Seerat's heart. Seerat's father decided to get Seerat married to Nihal. She agrees. Rajvir tells his mother that he is not a topper. This breaks her heart, but later is forgiven. She gives Seerat a suit that she was supposed to wear on her wedding with Rajveer. There she tells Seerat that Rajveer broke her heart because her father told him to. Nihal decided to become friends with Rajveer, but this is just a misunderstanding. He gives Rajveer the wedding card. Nihal tells him that he shouldn't come to his wedding. A day before Seerat and Nihal's wedding, Seerat tells him that she can never love him because a person can only fall in love once. She says that she fell in love with Rajveer. Hearing this, Nihal tells Rajveer that Seerat still loves him. He dares him to come to his wedding and fight for his love. Rajveer goes to the wedding and fights. He gets injured, but he still fights on. Eventually Seerat's parents give their blessings to the both of them and Rajveer takes Seerat with him. In the ending we see Rajveer Dhillon (Diljit Dosanjh). He has also stated to have a hockey with him like Rajveer Gill and Rajveer Dhillon had started to get respected in college.

Cast
Jimmy Sheirgill as Rajveer Gill      
Neeru Bajwa as Seerat Randhawa                               
Gippy Grewal as Nihal Dhasah                           
Binnu Dhillon as Taari (Nihal's Friend) (Cameo)
Jaswinder Bhalla as Rajveer's Mamma 
Diljit Dosanjh as Rajveer Dhillon (Guest appearance)

Release
Mel Karade Rabba released on 16 July 2010 in India, Australia, Canada, UK, NZ and USA across 50 screens.

Box office

The film collected Rs 19.5 million. in Punjab in its opening week. It went on to gross Rs 105.0 million.

Awards 
At the first PTC Punjabi Film Awards Mel Karade Rabba won the following:

 Won – Best Movie: Rajan Batra
 Won – Best Actor: Jimmy Sheirgill
 Won – Best Music Director: Jaidev Kumar
 Won – Critics Best Actress: Neeru Bajwa
 Won – Best Screenplay & Dialogue: Dheeraj Rattan
 Nominated – Best Debut Male: Gippy Grewal
 Nominated – Best Villain: Gippy Grewal
 Nominated – Best Actress: Neeru Bajwa
 Nominated – Best Director: Navniant Singh

Soundtrack

References

External links

Punjabi-language Indian films
2010s Punjabi-language films
Punjabi remakes of Tamil films
Punjabi remakes of Hindi films
Films scored by Jaidev Kumar